Runirgod District is a district in the southeastern Middle Shabelle (Shabeellaha Dhexe) region of Somalia. The district, just about 240 km from Mogadishu, is the most eastern town of the region bordering with Ceeldhere of Galgaduud region on the East, Adale on the Southwest, Aadan yabaal on the West and the Indian Ocean on the South. Its economy is largely based on animal husbandry and farming. 

Districts of Somalia